Mangelia maculata is a species of sea snail, a marine gastropod mollusk in the family Mangeliidae.

This is not Cythara maculata Brazier, 1876 (synonym of Eucithara alacris Hedley, 1922)

Description
The length of the shell attains 10 mm

The shell is white, with an orange-brown band, interrupted by the ribs, and appearing only in the interstices.

Distribution
This marine species occurs off the Philippines

References

External links
 

maculata
Gastropods described in 1846